AS Roma Futsal is a futsal club based in Rome, Italy.

In the year 2004 Roma RCB and Gruppo Sportivo BNL merged in AS Roma Futsal

Honours

Roma RCB
 Campionati italiani: 5
 87/88 - 88/89 - 89/90 - 90/91 - 2000/01 -
 Coppa Italia: 2
 1989 - 1990
 European Champions Tournament: 1
 1989
 Torneo Internazionale di Angers: 1
 2004

Giovanili
 Campionati italiani Juniores: 2
 1997 - 1998
1 coppa lazio 2003
1 campionato regionale 2004

Gruppo Sportivo BNL 
 Campionati italiani: 4
 91/92 - 94/95 - 95/96 - 96/97
 European Champions Tournament: 1
 1996

Giovanili
  Coppa Italia Under 21: 1
 2004
 Campionati italiani Juniores: 1
 1992

External links
 Official Website

Futsal clubs in Italy